Oregon High School (OHS) is a high school located in Oregon, Wisconsin in the United States. It is part of the Oregon School District. Student enrollment is 1233. It is a member of the Badger Conference. The current building was constructed in the 1960s to replace the original building built in 1922. OHS was later remodeled in 2017 including athletic facilities and an academic wing..

Notable people
Dave Ahrens, professional football player who played for the Wisconsin Badgers and four teams in the NFL as a linebacker.
Shaka Smart, head basketball coach for the Marquette Golden Eagles, graduated from Oregon High School in 1995
Homer A. Stone, Wisconsin State Representative, ;farmer, and businessman, graduated from Oregon High School in 1885.
Lisa Stone, women's basketball head coach, Saint Louis University and University of Wisconsin
Kevin J. Anderson,  is an American science fiction author
 Micah Alberti, American model and actor

References

External links

 Oregon School District

Public high schools in Wisconsin
Schools in Dane County, Wisconsin
Educational institutions established in 1969
1969 establishments in Wisconsin